Ivan Ďatelinka (born March 6, 1983) is a Slovak professional ice hockey defenceman who is currently playing for HC '05 Banská Bystrica of the Slovak Extraliga.

Career statistics

Regular season and playoffs

References

External links

1983 births
Living people
Sportspeople from Topoľčany
MHC Martin players
HC Slovan Bratislava players
Slovak ice hockey defencemen
MHK Dolný Kubín players
HK 36 Skalica players
HC '05 Banská Bystrica players